Sudhir is an Indian masculine given name. The Sanskrit word  means "very wise", "resolute".

Notable people with the name include:

Sudhir (Pakistani actor) (1922–1997), Pakistani actor
Sudhir (Hindi actor) (1944–2014), Bollywood actor
Sudhir, Indian Para Powerlifter
Sudhir Chaudhary (journalist), Indian journalist
Sudhir Dalvi (born 1939), Indian actor
Sudhir Joshi (1948–2005), Indian Marathi actor and comedian
Sudhir Kakar (born 1938), Freudian psychoanalyst and writer
Sudhir Kumar Baliyan, Indian politician
Sudhir Kumar Chaudhary (born 1983), fan of the Indian cricket team
Sudhir Kumar Chitradurga, Indian weightlifter
Sudhir Kumar Giri, Indian politician
Sudhir Kumar Saxena, Tabla artist and professor
Sudhir Mishra, Indian film director and screenwriter
Sudhir Naik (born 1945), Indian cricketer
Sudhir Pandey, Indian film and serial television actor
Sudhir Phadke (1919–2002), Marathi singer-composer from India
Sudhir Ranjan Majumdar (1934–2009), Chief Minister of Tripura, India, 1988–1992
Sudhir Ruparelia (born 1956), businessman and entrepreneur in Uganda
Sudhir Tailang (1960–2016), Indian cartoonist
Sudhir Alladi Venkatesh (born 1966), Indian sociologist and urban ethnographer

References 

Indian masculine given names